In geology, a massif ( or ) is a section of a planet's crust that is demarcated by faults or flexures. In the movement of the crust, a massif tends to retain its internal structure while being displaced as a whole. The term also refers to a group of mountains formed by such a structure.

In mountaineering and climbing literature, a massif is frequently used to denote the main mass of an individual mountain. The massif is a smaller structural unit of the crust than a tectonic plate, and is considered the fourth-largest driving force in geomorphology.

The word is taken from French (in which the word also means "massive"), where it is used to refer to a large mountain mass or compact group of connected mountains forming an independent portion of a range. One of the most notable European examples of a massif is the Massif Central of the Auvergne region of France.

The Face on Mars is an example of an extraterrestrial massif.

Massifs may also form underwater, as with the Atlantis Massif.

List of massifs

Africa

 Adrar des Ifoghas – Mali
Aïr Massif – Niger
Benna Massif – Guinea
Bongo Massif – Central African Republic
Ennedi Plateau – Chad
Kilimanjaro Massif – border of Kenya and Tanzania
Oban Massif – Nigeria
Marojejy Massif – Madagascar
Mulanje Massif – Malawi
Virunga Massif – border shared by Uganda, Rwanda and DR Congo
Waterberg Biosphere – South Africa

Algeria 
 Collo Massif
Edough Massif
Khachna Massif

Antarctica
Borg Massif
Craddock Massif
Cumpston Massif
Vinson Massif
Otway Massif

Asia
Annapurna – Nepal
Bromo-Tengger-Semeru – Indonesia
Chu Pong Massif – Vietnam
Dhaulagiri – Nepal
Gasherbrum – China-Pakistan
Kangchenjunga – Nepal–India
Knuckles Massif – Sri Lanka
Kondyor Massif – Russia
Kugitangtau Ridge – Turkmenistan
Kumgangsan – North Korea
Logar ultrabasite massif – Afghanistan
Mount Ararat – Turkey
Mount Everest massif (including Lhotse) – border of Nepal and Tibet (China)
Mount Kinabalu – Malaysia
Mount Tomuraushi – Japan
 – Pakistan

India 
 Bundelkhand
 Nun Kun
Panchchuli
Shillong

Iran 
 Dena
 Hazaran
Kheru-Naru (Chekel)
Kholeno
Mount Damavand

Takht-e Suleyman Massif
Zard-Kuh

Kazakhstan 

Kokshetau Massif
Mount Ku
Myrzhyk

Europe

Aarmassif - Switzerland
Ardennes Massif – France/Belgium/Luxembourg
Åreskutan – Sweden
 – Austria
Bohemian Massif – Czech Republic
Ceahlău Massif – Romania
Gotthard Massif – Switzerland
Hesperian Massif - Iberian Peninsula
Jungfrau Massif – Switzerland
Mangerton Mountain – Ireland
Montgris – Spain
 – Spain
Mont Blanc massif – Italy/France/Switzerland
Rhenish Massif - Germany, Belgium, Luxembourg and France
 - Rhodope Massif – Bulgaria/Greece
Troodos – Cyprus
Untersberg – Germany/Austria
 Massif – Bulgaria

France 
 Alpilles
Aravis Range
Armorican Massif
Bauges Massif
Beaufortain Massif
Belledonne massif
Bornes Massif
Calanques Massif
Cerces Massif
Chablais Massif
Chartreuse Massif
Dévoluy Massif
Massif des Écrins
Jura Mountains
Lauzière massif

Massif de l'Esterel

Monte Cinto massif
Taillefer Massif
Queyras Massif
Vanoise Massif
Vercors Plateau
Vosges Mountains

Italy 
 
 Grappa Massif
 
 
 Monte Ermada
 Sila Massif
 Speikboden (South Tyrol)

United Kingdom 
 Ben Nevis massif
 Cornubian Massif
 Long Mynd
 Snowdon Massif

North America

Canada 

 Laurentian Massif – Quebec
 – Quebec
Mount Logan – Yukon

British Columbia

 Mount Cayley – British Columbia
 Level Mountain
Mount Edziza
Mount Meager massif
Mount Septimus

United States 

 Adirondack Massif – New York
 Denali – Alaska
 Mount Juneau – Alaska
Mount Katahdin - Maine
Mount Le Conte – Tennessee
Mount Shuksan – Washington
Mount Timpanogos - Utah
Teton Range – Wyoming

Oceania
Big Ben – Heard Island
Ahipara Gumfields – New Zealand

Caribbean
Massif de la Hotte – Haiti
Valle Nuevo Massif – Dominican Republic

South America
Brasilia Massif – Brazil, Argentina, Paraguay, Uruguay. 
Neblina Massif – Venezuela–Brazil border
Colombian Massif – Colombia
North Patagonian Massif – Argentina
Deseado Massif – Argentina

Submerged
Atlantis Massif – part of the Mid-Atlantic Ridge in the North Atlantic Ocean
Tamu Massif — the largest volcano on Earth

References

Landforms
Mountains